Xerotia is a genus of flowering plants belonging to the family Caryophyllaceae.

Its native range is Southern Arabian Peninsula.

Species:
 Xerotia arabica Oliv.

References

Caryophyllaceae
Caryophyllaceae genera